Wycliffe College Boat Club is a rowing club on the Gloucester and Sharpness Canal, based at Wycliffe College boathouse, Junction Bridge, Saul, Gloucestershire.

History
The club belongs to the Wycliffe College, Gloucestershire and shares the boathouse with the University of the West of England Boat Club.

The club has produced multiple national champions.

Honours

National champions

References

Sport in Gloucestershire
Rowing clubs in England
Scholastic rowing in the United Kingdom